This is a list of schools in Luohu District, Shenzhen.

Shenzhen municipal schools
Schools operated by the Shenzhen municipal government in Luohu District include:
Shenzhen Middle School
  (深圳市第二实验学校)
 Shenzhen Primary School (深圳小学)

Luohu district schools

Secondary schools

 Affiliated School of Luohu Education Institute - Qingshuihe Subdistrict
 Shenzhen Buxin Middle School
 Shenzhen Cuiyuan Junior Middle School	
 Shenzhen Cuiyuan Middle School	
 Shenzhen Cuiyuan Middle School Dongxiao
 Shenzhen Dawang School - Dawang Village, Donghu Subdistrict, 
 Shenzhen Donghu Middle School
 Shenzhen Guiyuan Middle School	
 Shenzhen Honggui Middle School
 Shenzhen Luohu Binhe Experimental Middle School
 Shenzhen Luohu Foreign Languages School - Liantang Subdistrict
 Shenzhen Luohu Foreign Languages School Experimental Section
 Shenzhen Luohu Foreign Languages Junior School - Liantang Subdistrict
 Shenzhen Luohu Middle School
 Shenzhen Luohu Senior High School	
 Shenzhen Luohu Senior High School Junior Section
 Shenzhen Luohu Xingyuan School
 Shenzhen Songquan Experimental School
 Shenzhen Sungang Middle School
 Shenzhen Wenjin Middle School

Vocational schools
 Shenzhen Xingzhi Vocational School (Shenzhen Art High School)

Primary schools

 Affiliated School of Luohu Education Institute - Qingshuihe Subdistrict
 Shenzhen Anfang Primary School
 Shenzhen Baicaoyuan Primary School
 Shenzhen Beidou Primary School 	
 Shenzhen Bibo Primary School
 Shenzhen Binhe Primary School 	
 Shenzhen BuXin Primary School
 Shenzhen Caopu Primary School - Caopu West Subdistrict
 Shenzhen Cuizhu Foreign Language Experimental School (Campuses I and II, both in Cuizhu Subdistrict)	
 Shenzhen Cuibei Experimental Primary School
 Shenzhen Cuiyin School
 Shenzhen Dawang School - Dawang Village, Donghu Subdistrict, 
 Shenzhen Dongchang Primary School
 Shenzhen Dongxiao Primary School
 Shenzhen Fengguang Primary School
 Shenzhen Guiyuan Primary School 	
 Shenzhen Honggui Primary School
 Shenzhen Honghu Primary School
 Shenzhen Hongling Primary School
 Shenzhen Huali Primary School - Beverly Hills
 Shenzhen Jingbei Primary School - Jingbeinan Residential Area
 Shenzhen Jingxuan Primary School 	
 Shenzhen Jintian Primary School (Jintian Campus and Dehong Campus)
 Shenzhen Liannan Primary School
 Shenzhen Liantang Primary School - Liantang
 Shenzhen Luofang Primary School
 Shenzhen Luohu Primary School
 Shenzhen Luohu Hubei Primary School
 Shenzhen Luohu Xingyuan Primary School	
 Shenzhen Luoling Foreign Language Experimental School (No. 1 and No. 2 Campuses)
 Shenzhen Nanhu Primary School
 Shenzhen Renmin Primary School
 Shenzhen Shuiku Primary School
 Shenzhen Shuitian Primary School
 Shenzhen Songquan Experimental School - Dongxiao Subdistrict
 Shenzhen Sungang Primary School
 Shenzhen Taining Primary School
 Shenzhen Taojinshan Primary School
 Shenzhen Wutong Primary School - Chishuidong Village, Wutong Mountain
 Shenzhen Xiantong Experimental Primary School - Liantang Sub-district
 Shenzhen Xiangxi Primary School
 Shenzhen Xinxiu Primary School
 Shenzhen Yijing Primary School

Notes

References

Luohu
Luohu District